Platteville Municipal Airport  is a city owned public use airport located three nautical miles (6 km) southeast of the central business district of Platteville, a city in Grant County, Wisconsin, United States. It is included in the Federal Aviation Administration (FAA) National Plan of Integrated Airport Systems for 2021–2025, in which it is categorized as a local general aviation facility.

Although most U.S. airports use the same three-letter location identifier for the FAA and IATA, this airport is assigned PVB by the FAA but has no designation from the IATA.

Facilities and aircraft
It has two asphalt paved runways: 15/33 is 3,999 by 75 feet (1,219 x 23 m); 7/25 is 3,599 by 75 feet (1,097 x 23 m).

A non-directional beacon was located at the facility, 203 kHz, ident PVB. It was decommissioned in 2011.

The fixed-base operator is A&A Aviation.

For the 12-month period ending April 22, 2021, the airport had 20,550 aircraft operations, an average of 56 per day: 97% general aviation, 3% air taxi and less than 1% military.

In January 2023, there were 21 aircraft based at this airport: 18 single-engine, 1 multi-engine and 2 jet.

See also
 List of airports in Wisconsin

References

External links 
 Platteville Municipal Airport at Wisconsin DOT Airport Directory
 

Airports in Wisconsin
Buildings and structures in Grant County, Wisconsin